Lyconotus is a genus of net-winged beetles in the family Lycidae. There is one described species in Lyconotus, L. lateralis.

References

Further reading

 
 

Lycidae
Articles created by Qbugbot